Harry Batt is a television pilot starring Ian Kirkby as the fictional "Geordie copper" DI Harry Batt. The article is about both the character and the show itself.

Dick and Dom in da Bungalow
Harry Batt first appeared on Dick and Dom in da Bungalow in 2004, at the beginning of the show's fourth series. His main reason for coming to Da Bungalow was to punish presenter Dominic Wood after it was learned that Wood had cheated in a game of That's The Stuff, on which Dom had replaced a jar of garlic mayonnaise with yoghurt. Harry forced Wood to eat the garlic mayonnaise on live TV as a punishment.

Games
Harry Batt devised two games during his appearances, both of which were shown during the last series of the show.

"Nae Body Move"
This game was first played on 10 September 2005 during the first episode of the fifth season of The Bungalow. It took place in the back garden of the Bungalow on Saturday mornings.

Aim of the game
The bungalowheads have to dress themselves as DC Harry Batt, using the items provided.
Harry has his back turned to the Bungalowheads.
They have to move closer and closer towards him, dressing themselves as they go.
At random moments, Harry turns round sharply, shouting "Nae Body Move!"
If he catches one of the Bungalow heads moving, they are out of the game.
The first person to reach the end of the course and shout the given statement, wins the game.
This statement was "Nae Body Move!" followed by SOMETHING "Squad" (e.g. "NAE BODY MOVE! CARROT SQUAD!)
The winner was awarded with Bungalow points.

The different "Squads"
The first Bungalow head to shout "Nae Body Move" followed by a squad name, won the game. Some of the different squads were: Carrot Squad (10 September), Blanket Squad, and Bee Squad.

Memorable games
The first game of "Nae Body Move":
It began with DC Harry Batt appearing through the compost heap.
Celebrity Rachel Stevens lost her moustache.
In the end, the game was ended as the cast broke down with laughter.

"Nae Buzzy Move":
Harry Batt dressed up a bumble bee
The Bungalow heads had to dress up as bees instead of the inspector.
Harry Batt's two brothers (Larry and Barry Batt) both appeared, dressed in bee costumes

DC Harry Batt's interrogation game
A game in which the chosen bungalowhead was "taken down the station for a bit of interrogation". In this game the scene was that of a typical police interrogation, the bungalowhead had a secret word, given to them by Dick and Dom. Harry then had ninety seconds to ask them some questions. While being asked these questions the bungalowhead had to say the word as many times as possible, without Harry being able to guess the secret word. When ninety seconds was up, he attempted to guess the secret word. If he got it right, the bungalowhead lost all their bungalow points. If he got it wrong, the bungalowhead gained 20 bungalow points for each time they said the word.

Harry Batt TV pilot
On 12 January 2007 at 5:00pm (GMT), Harry Batt appeared the first show of his long awaited series, as part of Gina's Laughing Gear on CBBC1. The show is written by Kirkby, Chapman, Steve Ryde and Julian Kemp. Also appearing on the show are Chapman, Melvin Odoom and Lee Barnett, who have also appeared with Kirkby in Dick and Dom in da Bungalow and The Slammer.

It is produced by Ryde, who also produced Dick and Dom in da Bungalow and The Slammer.

Episode 1
BBC One - Friday, 12 January 2007 @ 5:00pm (GMT)
Repeated - CBBC Channel - Saturday, 13 January 2007 @ 6:30pm (GMT)

"DI Harry Batt is called upon to stop a spate of illegal sofa bouncing, and cope with sweeping changes to the police force."

Series of events
 Last year, the chief inspector made "a very strange decision" to allow the minimum age of joining the police force to be lowered to 4.
 Recently, a crime wave of 'sofa bouncing' has hit DC Harry Batt's 'patch'.
 The darts championship is taking place. The Chief Inspector decides to have the PCs to go to the final in the fairest way...by tombola. PC Maqueen (Dave Chapman) and PC Presents (Lee Barnett) are chosen for the job.
 At a 'Chrispies' auction, Antony Worrall Thompson's 'antique' 1997 sofa is sold for £50. A woman in the crowd suddenly bounces on the sofa. Everyone is horrified, especially Thompson who thought it would fetch at least £300.
 Meanwhile, Inspector Batt is walking down a road, eating chips. From the corner of his eye, he sees three men, bouncing on sofas in a house. When he returns for a closer look, the men are gone. A woman and a man (Lee Barnett) appear, requiring assistance; their sofas have been bounced on.
 One more woman appears and informs Harry that the rascals have just come out of Number 19. He realises that number 19 is his "hoose" and runs to see the damage.
 In a theatre, during a comedy production "Knickers to the Vicars", a doorbell rings out of cue. Dave Chapman answers it. Lee runs in and bounces on the sofa.
 Back at the police station, all occurrences of sofa bouncing have been plotted on a map of the area. DI Batt asks the constables if they can see a pattern.
 PC Figgis sees a Christmas tree. This idea is abandoned after Harry questions "where's the top".
 Another boy believes it is in the shape of a fried egg. Batt believes this is a more plausible idea, pointing out the white of the egg and the "yerk".
 The last girl thinks it is a "velociraptor eating a goat". This child is told to "get out".
 Harry states that it follows the number 28 bus route.
 Harry Batt and the rest of the group stake out at the next stop, a cafe, the group soon becomes distracted by watching the darts semi-final, and the sofa is bounced upon.
 The bouncer bounces up to the roof, causing his body to become stiff and leaving a face-mark in the wall.
 The group inspect the crime scene. Harry states there must be a clue, maybe a strand of hair or a finger print or maybe even a cryptic message written in invisible ink on the wall to taunt them (although he admits the last one doesn't usually happen.)
 A small boy tries to tell Harry about the face-print, but Harry ignores him. When Harry spots the face-print he claims it as his find.
 The police group take a cast of the face and Harry goes about town trying to find a match, without success.
 PC Maqueen and PC Presents drink the super unhealthy energy drink belonging to darts finalist Barry Whippet (Mark Donovan). Barry is taken ill and Maqueen and Presents are quick to blame a saboteur trying to ruin the darts final.
 The police group decide to stake out at the next point, a shop selling extra-springy beds.
 Two hoodies are seen testing a bed.
 Harry arrests the hoodies, they explain they are just looking for a comfortable bed for their poor old Nan, proving this with a photo.
 Melvin begins bouncing on the beds, Harry follows and catches him.
 Melvin is interrogated, and agrees to show them the villains hideout.
 Harry enters the hideout, undercover. He says his name is "Mr. Lampshade". He has a camera in his hat and a microphone in his jacket. The police squad are supposed to be watching the footage from Harry's camera hat. But, the change channel to watch the darts championship final, where Barry has just recovered and is playing well.
 Harry shows off his bouncing skills and is called in to meet the crime boss.
 The Crime bosses face matches the face print. The crime boss catches on to Harry and makes his getaway on a space-hopper.
 Harry turns off the darts final to get his squad to get to work.
 The squad follow the crime boss on pogo-sticks and space-hoppers.
 Barry Whippet needs a bulls-eye to win the darts championship final.
 The crime boss bursts into the building the darts is being played at, Barry's dart goes through the boss' space-hopper and hits the bulls-eye.
 Harry arrests the crime boss saying, "You're nicked."
 Harry and a small boy are on the roof of a building. Harry asks the boy what has he learnt today. The boy replies, "Well, sir...nothing.""Aye ... [J]ust how it should be", Harry says, and breaks into his own rendition of Bounce by Bon Jovi. The boy walks away in disgust.

Cameo appearance in The Legend of Dick and Dom
Harry Batt appeared with another Geordie copper (played by Dave Chapman) in The Legend of Dick and Dom episode 'The Mists of Time' when Princes Dick and Dom find themselves in modern-day Sluff (Slough). Harry Batt is hypnotised by Mannitol into thinking he is a showgirl, He also reprised a similar role in a later episode where he plays Sheriff Harold Batt who arrests the main characters before trying to intercept their evil clones during the "Fairest Fairy Fayre".

Harry Batt also returned to CBBC to celebrate the anniversary of Dick and Dom in da Bungalow alongside Dick and Dom.

References

External links
 
 http://www.bbc.co.uk/drama/holbycity/characters-cast/characters/josephbyrne.shtml

Batt, Harry